Funa tayloriana is a species of sea snail, a marine gastropod mollusk in the family Pseudomelatomidae, the turrids and allies.

Description
The length of the shell varies between 25 mm and 40 mm.

Distribution
This marine species occurs off Mozambique and in the Indo-West Pacific.

References

   Hedley, C. 1922. A revision of the Australian Turridae. Records of the Australian Museum 13(6): 213–359, pls 42–56

External links
 Specimen at MNHN, Paris
 
 

tayloriana
Gastropods described in 1846